Lakeview Historic District may refer to:
 Lakeview Historic District (Chicago, Illinois)
 Lakeview Historic District (Lakeview, North Carolina), a National Register of Historic Places listings in Moore County, North Carolina
 Lakeview Historic District (Cheyenne, Wyoming)

See also
 Lakeview Village Historic District, Bridgeport, Connecticut, a National Register of Historic Places listing in Bridgeport, Connecticut
 South Lakeview Historic District, New Orleans, Louisiana, a National Register of Historic Places listing in Orleans Parish, Louisiana